Roger Anthony Brett Morris (born 18 July 1968) is the area Bishop of Colchester in the Church of England Diocese of Chelmsford. He was previously the Archdeacon of Worcester.

Early life and education
Morris was born on 18 July 1968 in Hereford, Herefordshire, England. He was educated at Chipping Sodbury School and Filton Technical College. He studied at Imperial College, London, graduating with a Bachelor of Science (BSc) degree in 1989. From 1990 to 1993, he trained for ordination at Ridley Hall, Cambridge, an evangelical Anglican theological college. During this time, he also studied theology at Trinity College, Cambridge, graduating with a Bachelor of Arts (BA) degree in 1992: as per tradition, his BA was promoted to a Master of Arts (MA Cantab) degree in 2008.

Ordained ministry
Morris was ordained in the Church of England as a deacon in 1993 and as a priest in 1994. After a curacy in Northleach he was the incumbent at Sevenhampton from  1996 to 2003; and then Director of Parish Development and Evangelism for the Diocese of Coventry from then until his archdeacon's appointment. From 2008 to 2014, he was Archdeacon of Worcester in the Diocese of Worcester.

On 2 May 2014, Morris was announced as the next Bishop of Colchester, a suffragan bishop in the Diocese of Chelmsford. He was consecrated as a bishop on 25 July 2014 at St Paul's Cathedral by Justin Welby, Archbishop of Canterbury.

Personal life
Morris is married to Sally, a headteacher in a secondary school and a Minister in Secular Employment (MSE). They have two daughters. Morris stage-manages the Canopy Stage (previously The Performance Café) at the annual Greenbelt Christian Arts Festival. His interests include popular music, films, supporting Bristol Rovers and walking the family's two dogs.

References

1946 births
Living people
Alumni of Trinity College, Cambridge
Archdeacons of Worcester
Bishops of Colchester
Alumni of Imperial College London
Alumni of Ridley Hall, Cambridge